Rhaphium melampus is a species of long-legged fly in the family Dolichopodidae.

References

Rhaphiinae
Articles created by Qbugbot
Insects described in 1861
Taxa named by Hermann Loew